Mottistone Manor is a National Trust  property in the village of Mottistone on the Isle of Wight, England. It has popular gardens and is a listed building. It was first mentioned in documents related to the Domesday Book of 1086.

History
The oldest parts of the manor, the south-east wing, date from the fifteenth or early sixteenth century. The north-west wing was added or remodelled by Thomas Cheke in 1567, and additions to the south-east wing were made in the early seventeenth century. The whole house was remodelled in the 1920s by the architects Seely & Paget, John Seely, Lord Mottistone (1899–1963) of the firm being a great-grandson of Charles Seely (1803–1887), who had bought the house and estate in 1861.

Though not open to the public, the manor has hosted gatherings for the Seely family. The great-great granddaughter of General J. E. B. Seely, 1st Baron Mottistone, the theatre and opera director Sophie Hunter, held her wedding reception here with  Benedict Cumberbatch on 14 February 2015.

Gallery

References 

Gardens on the Isle of Wight
National Trust properties on the Isle of Wight
Grade II* listed buildings on the Isle of Wight
Grade II* listed houses
Manor houses in England
Brighstone